Laurence Monroe Baer is an American businessman. He is best known as the president and chief executive officer of the San Francisco Giants of Major League Baseball. He succeeded Bill Neukom on January 1, 2012.

Early life and education
Born to a Jewish family, Baer attended Lowell High School in San Francisco and the University of California, Berkeley. He served as the sports director and business manager of KALX, the student-run radio station. As a junior, he negotiated with Oakland Athletics' owner Charlie Finley to make KALX the official radio station of the Athletics for its first 16 games. Baer served as the play-by-play announcer. He graduated from Berkeley with a degree in political science in 1980.

That same year, he joined the San Francisco Giants as its marketing director. He left the Giants to attend Harvard Business School and earned his MBA in 1985. After graduating, he worked for Westinghouse Broadcasting and CBS. At CBS, Baer worked as an assistant to the network's then-CEO and chairman Laurence Tisch.

Career
Baer returned to the Giants in 1992 to help form the ownership group that kept the team in San Francisco when an attempt was made to move the franchise to Tampa, Florida. Other members of the group included Charles Bartlett Johnson, Harmon Burns, Scott Seligman, Allan Byer, David S. Wolff and Peter Magowan, the Giants' CEO from 1992 to 2007.

During Magowan's tenure, Baer worked as his chief assistant. He led the design and development of a new ballpark for the Giants starting in 1995. Construction on the park began in 1997 and was completed in 2000. The park opened as Pacific Bell Park before changing names several times through the 2000s. Since 2019, it has been known as Oracle Park, after a $200-million naming rights deal.

In 1994, Baer established the first benefit by a professional sports team to fight AIDS. In 1995, Baer received the Sports Torch of Learning Award from the Scopus Society of the American Friends of the Hebrew University. In 2001, the Anti-Defamation League awarded him the Torch of Liberty Award.

In 2008, Baer became the Giants' club president. He succeeded Bill Neukom as the Giants' chief executive officer on January 1, 2012. He was added to the board of directors of the San Jose Giants, the Giants' Minor League Baseball affiliate in the Class A-Advanced California League, in April 2012.

In 2014, Baer received an "Excellence in Achievement" award from UC Berkeley and a Civic Leadership Award from the American Jewish Committee San Francisco. He is the Chairman and CEO of the Giants Development Services, which is oversees the construction of Mission Rock, a 25-acre mixed-use neighborhood located near AT&T Park.

Personal life
He is married to Pamela Baer; they have four children and live in San Francisco. He and his wife are members of Congregation Emanu-El in San Francisco.

In March 2019 near Oracle Park, a video was released of Baer in a physical altercation as he attempted to wrestle away a cellphone from his wife. He was suspended by MLB and returned to the team on July 2, 2019.

The Obama administration appointed Baer as a member of the United States Holocaust Memorial Council. He was a board member of JCC of San Francisco and sits on the Boys and Girls Clubs of America Pacific Region Board of Trustees.

References

Living people
San Francisco Giants executives
San Francisco Giants owners
Harvard Business School alumni
Westinghouse Broadcasting
Jewish American baseball people
University of California, Berkeley alumni
Place of birth missing (living people)
American chief executives of professional sports organizations
Businesspeople from San Francisco
1957 births
21st-century American Jews